Neurofibromatosis type 4 (also known as "Neurofibromatosis variant type") resembles von Recklinghausen's disease, but also presents with cutaneous neurofibromas.

This is a new development in the NF family.

See also
Neurofibromatosis
Skin lesion

References

External links 

Genodermatoses